Fulton City School District is a school district in Fulton, New York, United States. The current superintendent is Mr. Brian Pulvino.

The district operates six schools: G. Ray Bodley High School, Fulton Junior High, Fairgrieve Elementary,  Granby Elementary, Lanigan Elementary, and Volney Elementary.

Administration 
The District offices are located 167 South Fourth Street. The current Superintendent is Mr. Brian Pulvino.

Administrators 
Mr. Brian Pulvino–Superintendent
Ms. Elizabeth Conners–Executive Director of Instruction and Assessment
Ms. Kathy Nichols–Director of Finance
Mr. Thomas Greer–Director of Personnel
Mr. Christopher Ells–Director, Health, Physical Education and Athletics
Mr. Gerald Seguin–Director of Facilities, Operations and Transportation
Ms. Geri Geitner–Directory of Student Support Programs
Ms. Katherine Adams–Director of Special Instructional Programs and Pupil Services (SIPPS)
Mr. Dominick Lisi–Director of Technology
Mr. Daniel Carroll–Director of Instructional Support Services
Ms. Terry Warwick–Director of Food Services
Ms. Carrie Waloven–Director of Literacy/Universal Pre-K

Board of Education 
Mr. Robert Ireland – Vice President
Mrs. Robbin Griffin–President
Mr. Brian Hotaling–Clerk
Mrs. Rae Howard
Mrs. Rosemary Occhocinco
Mr. Daniel Pawlewicz
Mr. Robert Somers

Selected Former Superintendents 
Previous assignment and reason for departure denoted in parentheses
Mr. Robert A. MacDonald–1954-1959 (Principal - Fulton High School, retired)
Mr. Glenn W. Clark–1959-1976 (Principal - Fulton High School, retired)
Mr. William H. Rasbek–1981-1988
Mr. John Grant
Mr. Michael J. Egan–1995-2005 (Assistant Superintendent for Curriculum & Instruction - Fulton City School District, retired)
Mr. Michael A. Maroun–2005-2006

G. Ray Bodley High School 

G. Ray Bodley High School is located at 6 William Gillard Drive and serves grades 9 through 12. The current principal is Mrs. Donna Parkhurst, and the current vice principals are Ms. Amy Stephenson and former professional wrestler Mr. Marc J. Copani.

History

Selected former principals 
Previous assignment and reason for departure denoted within parentheses
Mr. Robert C. MacDonald–1929-1954 (Principal - Manlius High School, named Superintendent of Fulton City School District)
Mr. Glenn W. Clark–1954-1959 (Principal - Waddington High School, named Superintendent of Fulton City School District)
Mr. Carl F. Rowland–1959-1978 (Principal - J.R. Fairgrieve School, retired)
Mr. Joseph Campolietta–1979-1984 (Vice Principal - G. Ray Bodley High School, retired)
Mr. Michael J. Egan–1984-1992, 2008-2009 (Vice Principal - G. Ray Bodley, named Assistant Superintendent of Curriculum & Instruction of Fulton City Schools (1992), returned from retirement to serve interim appointment)
Mr. Martin L. Swenson
Mr. James G. Granozio–1992-Oct. 1994 (House Principal - Cicero-North Syracuse High School, resigned and placed on special assignment)
Mr. Allen Bilofsky–Oct. 1994-Jun. 1995 [interim] (Vice Principal - G. Ray Bodley High School, returned to VP duties)
Ms. Mary P. Kinsella–1995-1997 (Vice Principal - Pine Grove Junior High School, resigned)
Mrs. Jackie Stewart–1997-2001 (Vice Principal - G. Ray Bodley High School, retired)
Mr. Patrick Dolan [interim]–2001–2003
Mr. Dennis P. Dumas–2003-2008 (Vice Principal - G. Ray Bodley High School, placed on special assignment and retired)
Mr. Brian Buchanan–2009-2012 (Principal - Willard Prior Elementary School, named Assistant Principal of G. Ray Bodley High School)

Selected former assistant principals 
Previous assignment and reason for departure denoted within parentheses
Mr. Joseph Campolietta–1965-1979 (Social Studies teacher - Fulton City School District, named Principal of G. Ray Bodley High School)
Mr. Michael J. Egan–1978-1984 (unknown, named Principal of G. Ray Bodley High School)
Mr. Bruce Burritt–?-1984 (Unknown, named Principal of Port Byron High School)
Mr. David Borst–1984-1985 [interim] (Director of Guidance - G. Ray Bodley High School, named Director of Guidance at Phoenix High School)
Mr. Allen P. Bilofsky–1984-1996 (Vice Principal/Social Studies instructor - Westhill High School, named Principal of Waterloo High School)
Mr. Louis P. Chistolini–1985-1988 (Guidance counselor - Solvay High School, unknown)
Ms. Margaret G. Culkowski–1988-1990 (Graduate assistant - Syracuse University, resigned)
Mrs. Jacalyn Stewart–1990-1997 (Administrative Intern - Corcoran High School, named Principal of G. Ray Bodley High School)
Mr. Kenneth Chatterton [interim]–1991-1992
Mr. Dennis Dumas–2000-2003 (Assistant Middle School Principal - Fayetteville-Manlius Central School District, named Principal of G. Ray Bodley High School)
Mr. Kenneth Brafman
Mr. John Phillips [interim]
Mrs. Tina Winkler–?-2008 (unknown, resigned)
Mrs. Deborah Stuetz–2008-2012 (unknown, named Assistant Principal of Fulton Junior High School)
Mr. William Greene–2012-2015

Fulton Junior High 

Fulton Junior High School is located at 129 Curtis Street and serves grades 7 and 8. The current principal is Mr. Marc Copani and the current assistant principal is Ms. Elizabeth Stoddard.

History

Selected former principals 

Mr. Ryan Lanigan –?-2017*Mr. Mark Slosek–?-2007
Ms. Donna Parkhurst–2007-2011 (Principal of Volney Elementary School, named Principal of G. Ray Bodley High School)

Selected former assistant principals 
Mr. Ryan Lanigan–2011-2013 (unknown, named Principal of Fulton Junior High School :.)

Fairgrieve Elementary 

Fairgrieve Elementary School is located at 716 Academy Street and serves grades pre-K through 6. The current principal is Ms. Jean Ciesla.

History

Selected former principals 
Mr. Fred Gibbons was first principal.  (Mr. Rowland taught metal shop at high school) <I was part of the first group to attend.  We were moved from Fourth Street School during the school year to Fairgrieve.  I was in the 6th grade>
Mr. Carl Rowland–1955-1958
Ms. Grace C. Lynch (acting)–1955
Mr. Stanley Finkle

Granby Elementary 

Granby Elementary School is located at 400 West Seventh Street, North and serves grades K through 6. The current principal is Ms. Heather J. Perry.

History

Selected former principals 
Ms. Janet Kimatian
Ms. Barbara Hubbard–?-2008

Lanigan Elementary 

J.E. Lanigan Elementary School is located at 59 Bakeman Street and serves grades K through 6. The current principal is Mr. Jeffrey Hendrickson.

History

Former principals 
Mr. Gordon F. Chesbro
Mr. Dan Johnson http://www.fulton.cnyric.org/schools/lanigan/index.cfm
Mr. Floyd W. Wallace - 1980's
Ms. Elizabeth Conners–?-2005
Mr. Terry Ward–2005-2008

Volney Elementary 

Volney Elementary School is located at 2592 State Route 3 and serves grades K through 6. The current principal is Mr. Todd Terpening.

History

Former principals 
Mr. Blayne Webb
Mr. Harold Waugh
Ms. Donna Parkhurst–?-2007

References

External links
Official site

School districts in New York (state)
Education in Oswego County, New York